The 2014 Kazan Kremlin Cup was a professional tennis tournament played on indoor hard courts. It was the fifth edition of the tournament which was part of the 2014 ATP Challenger Tour. It took place in Kazan, Russia between 10 and 16 March 2014.

Singles main-draw entrants

Seeds

 Rankings are as of October 14, 2013.

Other entrants
The following players received wildcards into the singles main draw:
  Baris Erguden
  Timur Kiuamov
  Andrey Rublev
  Vaja Uzakov

The following players used Protected Ranking to gain entry into the main draw:
  Sergei Bubka

The following players received entry from the qualifying draw:
  Dominik Meffert
  Denis Matsukevich
  Jürgen Zopp
  Gilles Müller

Champions

Singles

 Marsel İlhan def.  Michael Berrer, 7–6(8–6), 6–3

Doubles

  Flavio Cipolla /  Goran Tošić def.  Victor Baluda /  Konstantin Kravchuk, 3–6, 7–5, [12–10]

External links
Official Website
ATP official site

Kazan Kremlin Cup
2014
2014
2014 in Russian tennis
March 2014 sports events in Russia